Faride Virginia Raful Soriano is a lawyer, politician, and radio and TV presenter from the Dominican Republic. She is the current senator of the National District. She also serves as senate majority leader.

Life and career
Raful was born in Santo Domingo, to politician and poet Tony Raful, winner of the 2014 National Prize of Literature, and his wife Grey Soriano.

She studied law at the Pontificia Universidad Católica Madre y Maestra; she obtained a master's degree in telecommunications law and information technology at Charles III University of Madrid. She has also studied at the University of Salamanca and the University of Andes.

In radio Raful has worked as radio host and producer in Sin Tacones Ni Corbatas in 95.7FM La Nota and in Voces Propias of Z101. In television she worked as a TV host at NCDN.

In the 2010 congressional election Raful was a Dominican Revolutionary Party candidate for deputy of the National District, but lost. Six years later, she ran again for deputy, this time for the Modern Revolutionary Party, winning a seat in the lower house of the Dominican Congress.

2020 election 
In the 2020 Dominican General Election, Raful was elected as the senator for the National District, beating Rafael Paz of the Dominican Liberation Party, And Vinicio Castillo of the Social Christian Reformist Party. She also became the spokeswoman of her party in the senate.

See also     
Tony Raful
Freddy Ginebra
Geovanny Vicente
Nuria Piera
Miguel Franjul
Samir Saba
Milagros Germán
Pedro Henríquez Ureña
Orlando Martínez Howley
Tony Dandrades

References

External links 

20th-century Dominican Republic lawyers
Pontificia Universidad Católica Madre y Maestra alumni
Charles III University of Madrid alumni
Dominican Republic people of Lebanese descent
21st-century Dominican Republic women politicians
21st-century Dominican Republic politicians
Dominican Revolutionary Party politicians
Modern Revolutionary Party politicians
1979 births
Living people
Dominican Republic women lawyers
Members of the Chamber of Deputies of the Dominican Republic
Women members of the Congress of the Dominican Republic
Dominican Republic Roman Catholics